Osvaldo Simeone is a Professor of Information Engineering with the Centre for Telecommunications Research at the Department of Informatics at King's College, London. He received an M.Sc. degree (with honors) and a Ph.D. degree in information engineering from the Politecnico di Milano, Italy, in 2001 and 2005, respectively. He was previously a Professor of Electrical Engineering at the New Jersey Institute of Technology (NJIT) in Newark.

Simeone's research interests include wireless communications, information theory, optimization, and machine learning. Dr. Simeone is a co-recipient of the 2017 JCN Best Paper Award, the 2015 IEEE Communications Society Best Tutorial Paper Award, and of the Best Paper Awards of IEEE SPAWC 2007 and IEEE WRECOM 2007.

Simeone currently serves as an Editor for IEEE Transactions on Information Theory. Dr Simeone is a co-author of a monograph, an edited book published by Cambridge University Press, and more than one hundred research journal papers. He was named a Fellow of the Institute of Electrical and Electronics Engineers (IEEE) in 2016 for his contributions to cooperative cellular systems and cognitive radio networks.

References 

Fellow Members of the IEEE
Living people
New Jersey Institute of Technology faculty
21st-century American engineers
Year of birth missing (living people)
American electrical engineers